The Karate competition at the 2005 Mediterranean Games was held in the Rafael Florido Sports Hall in Almería, Spain.

Medallists

Men's competition

Women's competition

Medal table

References
Results

Sports at the 2005 Mediterranean Games
2005
2005 in karate
International karate competitions hosted by Spain